Lawrence D'Souza is an Indian film director (earlier worked as cinematographer) known for his Hindi films of the 1990s.

Filmography

References

External links

Hindi-language film directors
Year of birth missing (living people)
Living people
20th-century Indian film directors
21st-century Indian film directors